Marvin Campbell (born 14 July 1961) is a British gymnast. He competed in eight events at the 1992 Summer Olympics.

References

External links
 

1961 births
Living people
British male artistic gymnasts
Olympic gymnasts of Great Britain
Gymnasts at the 1992 Summer Olympics
Sportspeople from Manchester